Carleton—Mississippi Mills (formerly known as Lanark—Carleton and Carleton—Lanark) was a federal electoral district in Ontario, Canada, that was represented in the House of Commons of Canada from 1988 to 2015.

This riding was created in 1987 from parts of Lanark—Renfrew—Carleton and Nepean—Carleton ridings. At first, it was named "Carleton–Lanark". The name was changed to the current name as of September 1, 2004. The riding consists of the former Townships of Ramsay and Pakenham in the Town of Mississippi Mills, the former Townships of Goulbourn and West Carleton, and the former city of Kanata all in the city of Ottawa.

Initially, the boundaries of the riding were contentious. According to a report of the House of Commons committee that reviewed all new riding boundaries created in that year's redistribution of ridings, "the Township of Mississippi Mills has strenuously protested being placed within Carleton–Lanark.  It feels it does not belong to, and should not be attached to, an Ottawa-focused riding." In May 2004, Mississippi Mills town council voted to be moved out of the riding and into the same riding as the rest of Lanark County. Over 1,000 residents of the township mailed postcards to the Speaker of the House of Commons protesting the new boundaries.

Gordon O'Connor of the Conservative Party of Canada was the riding's Member of Parliament from 2004 to 2015.  During this time, he served as the Minister of National Revenue and the Minister of National Defence.

Following the Canadian federal electoral redistribution, 2012, the riding was dissolved.  The bulk of the riding—nearly all of the Ottawa portion—became part of Kanata—Carleton, while a smaller portion was transferred to Carleton.  Mississippi Mills became part of Lanark—Frontenac—Kingston.

Members of Parliament

Election results

Carleton—Mississippi Mills

Carleton—Lanark

Note: Conservative vote is compared to the total of the Canadian Alliance vote and Progressive Conservative vote in 2000 election.

Lanark—Carleton

Note: Canadian Alliance vote is compared to the Reform vote in 1997 election.

See also
 List of Canadian federal electoral districts
 Past Canadian electoral districts

References

 Campaign expense data from Elections Canada
Federal riding history from the Library of Parliament:
Lanark—Carleton
Carleton—Lanark
Carleton—Mississippi Mills
2011 Results from Elections Canada

Notes

Federal electoral districts of Ottawa
Former federal electoral districts of Ontario